Christantus Ejike Uzoenyi (born 23 March 1988) is a Nigerian professional footballer who plays as a left winger for Sunshine Stars.

Club career
Uzoenyi has played club football in Nigeria and France for Enyimba, Rangers International and Rennes. On 20 February 2014, he signed for South African club Mamelodi Sundowns; he will remain with Enugu Rangers on loan before moving to South Africa in June 2014. On 15 February 2017, Uzoenyi signed with South African club Bidvest Wits. He then joined Ajax Cape Town. Uzoenyi parted ways with Ajax Cape Town in December 2017.

On 28 February 2020, Uzoenyi returned to football and signed a contract with, at the time, Bosnian Premier League club Zvijezda 09. He made his official debut for Zvijezda 09 in a 3–0 defeat against Željezničar on 29 February 2020.

In July 2020, Uzoenyi left Zvijedza 09 and shortly after, joined Montenegrin First League club Titograd. However, the deal was never officially confirmed and he played the rest of 2020 at Zvijezda 09.

In the summer 2020, Uzoenyi returned to Nigeria and joined Sunshine Stars.

International career
Uzoenyi made his international debut for Nigeria in 2012, and has appeared in FIFA World Cup qualifying matches. He was called up to Nigeria's 23-man squad for the 2013 Africa Cup of Nations. He was named to Nigeria's squad for the 2014 African Nations Championship and was selected the most valuable player of the tournament.

Uzoenyi was also named in the provisional squad for the 2014 FIFA World Cup, making the final squad after Uwa Echiejile was excluded by injury.

Honours
Enyimba
Nigerian Professional Football League: 2005, 2007
Federation Cup: 2005

Mamelodi Sundowns
Premier Soccer League: 2015–16
Nedbank Cup: 2014–15
CAF Champions League: 2016

Bidvest Wits
Premier Soccer League: 2016–17

Nigeria
Africa Cup of Nations: 2013

References

1988 births
Living people
People from Aba, Abia
Association football wingers
Nigerian footballers
Nigeria international footballers
Enyimba F.C. players
Rangers International F.C. players
Stade Rennais F.C. players
Mamelodi Sundowns F.C. players
Bidvest Wits F.C. players
FK Zvijezda 09 players
Sunshine Stars F.C. players
Ligue 1 players
Premier League of Bosnia and Herzegovina players
Africa Cup of Nations-winning players
2013 Africa Cup of Nations players
2014 FIFA World Cup players
Nigerian expatriate footballers
Nigerian expatriate sportspeople in France
Expatriate footballers in France
Nigerian expatriate sportspeople in South Africa
Expatriate soccer players in South Africa
Nigerian expatriate sportspeople in Bosnia and Herzegovina
Expatriate footballers in Bosnia and Herzegovina
Nigeria A' international footballers
2014 African Nations Championship players